Uda Aida is a 2019 Indian-Punjabi Drama-comedy film written by Naresh Kathooria and directed by Ksshitij Chaudhary. Co-produced by Friday Russh Motion Pictures, Ksshitij Chaudhary Films, Naresh Kathooria Films; it stars Tarsem Jassar, Neeru Bajwa in lead roles with B.N. Sharma, Gurpreet Ghuggi and Karamjit Anmol in supporting roles. In the film a poor family has to cope with rich kids and their parents when their son is enrolled into a prestigious school.

The film was released theatrically on 1 February 2019. The film opened to positive response from critics and audience. Entire cast of the film got appreciation.

Cast 
 Tarsem Jassar as Gurnam
 Neeru Bajwa as Manjeet
 Poppy Jabbal as Myra
 Ansh Tejpal as Aman
 Karamjit Anmol as Iqbal ‘Reetha’
 Gurpreet Ghuggi aa Fouji Kartar Singh
 B. N. Sharma as Jagtar Singh
 Rose J. Kaur as Principal
 Jaspal Singh Sandhu as Vice-Principal

Marketing and release
The official trailer of the film was released on 3 January on YouTube, which has been viewed 7.3 million times since its release.

The film was released theatrically on 1 February 2019.

Reception

Box office 
The film has grossed ₹4.17 crore in Canada, ₹37 lacs in Australia, ₹54 lacs in United States, ₹66 lacs in Australia, and ₹21 lacs in New Zealand.

Critical reception 
Gurnaaz Kaur of The Tribune gave 3 stars out if 5 to the film. She praised the performances of Tarsem Jassar and Neeru Bajwa, and the supporting cast including Gurpreet Ghuggi, B.N. Sharma, and Karamjit Anmol.

Sukhpreet Kahlon of Cinestaan.com also gave 3 stars out of 5, saying, "Uda Aida explores in part the ramifications of giving up one's mother tongue." She praised the entire cast of the film while criticising the pace of the film saying, "A tighter script by Naresh Kathooria would have made a world of a difference."

References

External links 

 

2019 films
Punjabi-language Indian films
2010s Punjabi-language films
Indian comedy-drama films